Gaza is a province of Mozambique. It has an area of 75,709 km2 and a population of 1,422,460 (2017 census), which is the least populous of all the provinces of Mozambique.

Xai-Xai is the capital of the province. Inhambane Province is to the east, Manica Province to the north, Maputo Province to the south, South Africa to the west, and Zimbabwe to the northwest.

Geography
Most of the district lies in the basin of the Limpopo River, which runs from northwest to southeast through the district, emptying into the Indian Ocean near Xai-Xai. The Changane River, a tributary of the Limpopo, forms part of the province's eastern boundary. The Rio dos Elefantes (Olifants River) flows into the district from the west through the Massingir Dam, to empty into the Limpopo.

The Save River forms the northern boundary of the province.

The Limpopo railway, which connects Zimbabwe and Botswana to the port of Maputo, runs through the province, entering Zimbabwe at the border town of Chicualacuala.

The province, including the towns of Xai-Xai and Chokwe, were greatly affected by the 2000 Mozambique flood.

Limpopo National Park lies within the province, bounded by the Elefantes and Limpopo rivers and the South African border. Banhine National Park lies in the east-central portion of the province. The Great Limpopo Transfrontier Park and its associated conservation area, which is in the process of being formed, will cover the northern part of the province, including both national parks, and extend into adjacent parts of Mozambique, South Africa, and Zimbabwe.

Districts
The province was created on October 20, 1954, when Sul do Save District was divided into the districts of Gaza, Inhambane, and Lourenço Marques (later renamed Maputo). In 1978, Mozambique's districts were renamed provinces.

Gaza Province is divided into the 11 districts of:
Bilene Macia District
Chibuto District
Chicualacuala District
Chigubo District
Chókwè District
Guijá District 
Mabalane District
Manjacaze District
Massagena District
Massingir District 
Xai-Xai District

and the municipalities of:

Chibuto
Chókwè
Macia
Manjacaze 
Xai-Xai

Demographics

See also 
 Chicumbo
 Estádio da Gaza
 Gazaland
 Salane

References

External links
  Gaza Province official site

 
Provinces of Mozambique